Charles F. Rabenold (1883 - September 17, 1968) was an American architect from Pennsylvania. According to The Philadelphia Inquirer, he "designed homes for many Philadelphia business leaders and many public buildings."

References

1883 births
1968 deaths
University of Pennsylvania alumni
Architects from Pennsylvania
20th-century American architects